Joseph Williams Armstrong (10 October 1892 – 14 May 1966) was a footballer who played professionally at Inside Left for Portsmouth, Sheffield Wednesday and Norwich City.

References

Sources

1892 births
1966 deaths
English footballers
Portsmouth F.C. players
Sheffield Wednesday F.C. players
Norwich City F.C. players
Association football midfielders
Clapton F.C. players
AFC Bournemouth players